Mangelia payraudeauti is a species of sea snail, a marine gastropod mollusk in the family Mangeliidae.

Not to be confused with Pleurotoma payraudeauti Weinkauff, H.C., 1868

This species is considered by Tucker as a synonym of Mangelia attenuata (Montagu, G., 1803)

Description

Distribution
This species occurs in European waters off Portugal and Spain.

References

External links
 Deshayes, G. P., 1835. Mollusques. Pp. 81–203, pl. 18–26, in Bory de Saint-Vincent J.B.G.M. (ed.), Expédition scientifique de Morée. Section des Sciences Physiques. Tome III. 1ere Partie. Zoologie. Première Section. Animaux vertébrés, Mollusques et Polypiers. Levrault, Paris
 

payraudeauti
Gastropods described in 1835